†Viviparus diluvianus is an extinct species of freshwater snail with an operculum, an aquatic gastropod mollusk in the family Viviparidae, the river snails.

Distribution 
Type locality is near Berlin in Germany.

References

Viviparidae
Pleistocene gastropods
Gastropods described in 1865